Hylaeus azorae is a species of bee in the family Colletidae. It is known only from the island of Pico in the Azores (type locality: Mount Pico).

References

Colletidae
Insects described in 1992
Endemic arthropods of the Azores